The Australian Guineas is a Victoria Racing Club Group 1  Thoroughbred horse race for three-year-olds, run at set weights, over a distance of 1600 metres at Flemington Racecourse, in Melbourne, Australia in March during the VRC Autumn Racing Carnival. Total prize money is A$1,000,000.

History

Name
 1986–2004 - Australasian Guineas
 2005–2009 - Cadbury Guineas
 2010 - Crown Guineas
 2011 onwards - Australian Guineas

Distance
 1986–1997  – 1600 metres
 1998–2000 –  2000 metres 
 2001 onwards - 1600 metres

Grade
 1986 - Group 3
 1987 onwards - Group 1

Venue
 The race was run at Caulfield Racecourse in 2007 due to reconstruction of the Flemington racetrack.

Winners

 2022 - Hitotsu
 2021 - Lunar Fox
 2020 - Alligator Blood
 2019 -  Mystic Journey
 2018 - Grunt
 2017 - Hey Doc
 2016 - Palentino
 2015 - Wandjina
 2014 - Shamus Award
 2013 - Ferlax
 2012 - Mosheen
 2011 - Shamrocker
 2010 - Rock Classic
 2009 - Heart Of Dreams
 2008 - Light Fantastic
 2007 - Miss Finland
 2006 - Apache Cat
 2005 - Al Maher
 2004 - Reset
 2003 - Delago Brom
 2002 - Dash For Cash
 2001 - Mr. Murphy
 2000 - Pins
 1999 - Dignity Dancer
 1998 - Gold Guru
 1997 - Mouawad
 1996 - Flying Spur
 1995 - Baryshnikov
 1994 - Mahogany
 1993 - Kenny's Best Pal
 1992 - Jolly Old Mac
 1991 - Triscay
 1990 - Zabeel
 1989 - King’s High
 1988 - Flotilla
 1987 - Military Plume
 1986 - True Version

References

Flat horse races for three-year-olds
Group 1 stakes races in Australia
Flemington Racecourse